The Île de Batz is an island off Roscoff in Brittany, France. Administratively, it is a commune in the Finistère department of Brittany in north-western France.

Climate
Île de Batz has a oceanic climate (Köppen climate classification Cfb). The highest temperature ever recorded in Île de Batz was 

Population
Inhabitants of Île-de-Batz are called in French Batziens or Îliens.

At the census of 1999 the island had a population of 575, and in 2005 it had an estimated population of 594.

Sights
Jardin Georges Delaselle
Lighthouse

See also
Communes of the Finistère department

References

External links

Official website 
  Cultural Heritage 

Official website of colonie du phare 

Batz
Communes of Finistère
Car-free zones in Europe
Populated coastal places in France